Clarendon is a civil parish in Charlotte County, New Brunswick, Canada, located in the interior to the north of Point Lepreau and southwest of CFB Gagetown. It comprised a single local service district (LSD), which was a member of Regional Service Commission 11 (RSC11).

The Census subdivision of the same name shared the parish's boundaries.

Origin of name
The parish was named for Clarendon Settlement, which in turn was named in honour of the Earl of Clarendon, British Secretary of State for Foreign Affairs at the time of it being laid out.

History
Clarendon was erected in 1869 from Lepreau and Pennfield Parishes.

The area was first laid out for settlement in 1856, with the Clarendon Settlement being largest. Much of the parish was never surveyed for settlement, most of the surveyed lots were never granted, and many granted lots were later reconveyed to the Crown.

In 1868 the Clarendon District was created as a polling district taking in the northern part of Lepreau and Pennfield Parishes.

Boundaries
Clarendon Parish is bounded:

 on the north by the  Sunbury and  Queens County lines;
 on the east by Queens County;
 on the south by a due west line from the southernmost corner of Queens County;
 and on the west by the prolongation of the eastern line of grants that cross  Lake Utopia.

Local service district
The local service district of the parish of Clarendon comprises the entire parish.

The LSD was established in 1975 to assess for fire protection; recreational and sport facilities was added in 2008.

Today the LSD assesses for community & recreation services in addition to the basic LSD services of fire protection, police services, land use planning, emergency measures, and dog control. The taxing authority is 507.00 Clarendon.

Communities
Communities at least partly within the parish. italics indicate a name no longer in official use
 Back Clarendon
 Pleasington

Bodies of water
Bodies of water at least partly within the parish.

 North Branch Lepreau River
  South Branch Oromocto River
 West Branch Lepreau River
 Piskahegan Stream

 South Oromocto Lake
 The Basin
 York Dam Flowage
 more than fifty other official named lakes

Islands
Islands at least partly within the parish.
 Bradt Island (in McDougall Lake)
 Horse Island (in South Oromocto Lake)

Other notable places
Parks, historic sites, and other noteworthy places at least partly within the parish.
 Lepreau River Wildlife Management Area
 Little Tomoowa Lake Protected Natural Area

Demographics
Revised census figures based on the 2023 local governance reforms have not been released.

Population

Language

Access Routes
Highways and numbered routes that run through the parish, including external routes that start or finish at the parish limits:

Highways
None

Principal Routes

Secondary Routes:

External Routes:
None

Notes

References

Parishes of Charlotte County, New Brunswick
Local service districts of Charlotte County, New Brunswick